Rania A. Al-Mashat (born 20 June 1975) is an Egyptian economist and politician who is the country's current Minister of International Cooperation and former Minister of Tourism from 2018 until December 2019. She previously held high level positions at the International Monetary Fund in Washington DC and at the Central Bank of Egypt.

Early life and education
Al-Mashat was born in Cairo to Abdel Monem El Mashat, a professor of Political Science at Cairo University and Nagwa el-Attar, who worked at Ain Shams University. She graduated from The American University in Cairo (AUC) in 1995 with a Bachelor of Arts in Economics. Her father was appointed Egyptian Cultural and Educational Counselor at the Egyptian Embassy in Washington DC in 1995, and Al-Mashat enrolled at the nearby University of Maryland, where she completed her master's degree in 1998 and her PhD in 2001, specializing in International Economics with a focus on monetary policy and public debt management.

Career
Al-Mashat worked as an economist at the International Monetary Fund in Washington DC from June 2001 until July 2005. When she started at the IMF, at age 25, she was the youngest person working there. She worked on programs in India, Vietnam, and Gambia.

In August 2005, Al-Mashat returned to Egypt at the invitation of Minister of Investment Mahmoud Mohieldin to help modernise the bank's systems and dealings, where she worked as sub-governor and head of the Monetary Policy Department for the Central Bank of Egypt until May 2016. After the 2011 revolution, she helped construct and present the Government's Economic Program. She also taught economics at the American University in Cairo and served on the Boards of the Egyptian Exchange, Arab International Bank and the Middle East Economic Association.

In August 2016, Al-Mashat returned to the United States after she was appointed Advisor to the Chief Economist of the IMF, Maurice Obstfeld. She said of this role, "I think the experience I had was always to surprise people on the upside by being a capable, Arab woman." In 2017, she participated in the World Economic Forum's "Investing in Peace" panel and was listed as one of 10 economic experts whose input was sought for a discussion about "making the world a fairer place."

In January 2018, Al-Mashat was appointed Egypt's Minister of Tourism by Prime Minister Sherif Ismail, taking the number of women in the Cabinet to six.  Al-Mashat became the first woman to hold the position and Egypt's youngest minister. In this role she oversees the Egyptian Tourism Promotion Board and the Tourism Development Authority. She later said she was initially surprised at her appointment, but she understood that the president wanted the tourism sector "to be handled from an economic perspective." Tourism represents between 15-20 percent of Egypt's GDP.

In October 2018, Al-Mashat escorted US First Lady Melania Trump on her visit to the Giza Pyramids, saying that the visit conveyed the message of "Egypt's safety and security to the world." In January 2019, Al-Mashat announced that Egypt's Grand Museum will be launched in 2020 and will be run by the private sector as part of the government plan to step away from managing many ancient sites. Al-Mashat was one of six speakers at the World Tourism Forum in Lucerne May 2019.

Al-Mashat has spoken out about gender equality and the importance of education, saying, "To all Egyptian girls, continue to invest in your education. The world is very competitive and what you know is what distinguishes you from anyone else."

Awards and honours
Al-Mashat received the 2013 Distinguished Alumni Award from AUC. In 2014, the World Economic Forum named her a "Young Global Leader". In 2015, she was named one of the 50 most influential women in the Egyptian economy.

In March 2021, Al-Mashat received the “Champions of Change” award during a joint ceremony organised by the Embassies of Mexico, Canada, and Sweden in Cairo.

In December 2022, Al-Mashat received the award for “Most Visionary and Outstanding Minister of International Cooperation of 2022 in Africa”, presented by the George Washington University Institute of African Studies and the GE7 Initiative in the Visionary Leaders Annual Summit in Washington D.C.

Selected publications

Personal life
Al-Mashat is a Muslim and she first made a pilgrimage to Mecca in 1997.

References

External links
 
 Bloomberg Daybreak interview

Living people
1975 births
Politicians from Cairo
The American University in Cairo alumni
University of Maryland, College Park alumni
Egyptian women economists
21st-century Egyptian economists
International Monetary Fund people
Egyptian women academics
Women government ministers of Egypt
Tourism ministers of Egypt
21st-century Egyptian women politicians
21st-century Egyptian politicians
Academic staff of The American University in Cairo